Scottish Renewables is the trade body for Scotland's renewable energy industry. Since 1996, it has been working to grow Scotland’s renewable energy sector and sustain its position at the forefront of the global clean energy industry. Scottish Renewables represents around 260 member organisations which work across all renewable energy technologies, in Scotland, the UK, Europe and around the world. The members represent a wide range of sectors across all technologies including offshore wind power, onshore wind power, low-carbon heat, hydro, marine energy, and solar.

External links
 

Renewable energy in Scotland
1996 establishments in Scotland
Industry trade groups based in Scotland
Industry in Scotland
Organizations established in 1996
Organisations based in Glasgow
Renewable energy organizations